Odisha, a state on the eastern coast of India, is divided into 30 administrative geographical units called Districts. These 30 districts have been placed under three different revenue divisions to streamline their governance. The divisions are Central, North and South with their headquarters at Cuttack (Central Division), Sambalpur (Northern Division), Berhampur (Southern Division) respectively. Each division consists of 10 districts, and has as its administrative head a Revenue Divisional Commissioner (RDC), a senior rank officer of Indian Administrative Service. The position of the RDC in the administrative hierarchy is that between that of the district administration and the state secretariat. Each District is governed by a Collector & District Magistrate, who is appointed from the Indian Administrative Service. The Collector & District Magistrate is responsible for collecting the revenue and maintaining law and order in the district. Each District is separated into Sub-Divisions, each governed by a Sub-Collector & Sub-Divisional Magistrate. The Sub-Divisions are further divided into Tahasils. The Tahasils are headed by Tahasildar. Odisha has 03 Divisions, 30 Districts, 58 Sub-Divisions, 317 Tahasils and 314 Blocks.

List of districts by divisions 
The 30 districts of Odisha have been placed under three different revenue divisions to streamline their governance. The divisions are Central, North and South with their headquarters at Cuttack (Central Division), Sambalpur (Northern Division), Berhampur (Southern Division) respectively. Each division consists of 10 districts, and has as its administrative head a Revenue Divisional Commissioner (RDC), a senior rank officer of Indian Administrative Service. The position of the RDC in the administrative hierarchy is that between that of the district administration and the state secretariat. The list of districts, organized by divisions:

Administration
Collector & District Magistrate is an Indian Administrative Service (IAS) Officer in charge of revenue collection and administration of a district and Superintendent of Police (SP), an officer of Indian Police Service (IPS) is responsible for maintaining law and order and related issues of a district in Odisha.

Districts

There are 30 districts in Odisha. Mayurbhanj is the largest district and Jagatsinghpur is the smallest district by area. Ganjam is the largest district and Deogarh is the smallest district by population in Odisha. Bhubaneswar, the capital city of Odisha is located in Khordha district. The area and population of the 30 districts are given below:

References

External links

 Official website of Government of Odisha

 
Districts
Odisha